Candi Carter (born February 19, 1969) is an American broadcast executive and television talk show producer. She won two Daytime Emmy Awards, one in 1994 for Outstanding Children’s Programming Special on WISN-TV, and another in 2020 for Outstanding Informative Talk Show for The View.

Early life and education
Carter was born and raised in Detroit, Michigan, and attended Boston College where she received her bachelor’s degree in communications in 1991.

Career
Carter began her career as a programming producer at WISN-TV in 1993. Since then, she has worked as a producer on shows ranging from The Oprah Winfrey Show, the Tyler Perry Talk Show, Just Keke, Ice & Coco, The View, and Tamron Hall.

The Oprah Winfrey Show 
From 1996 to 2011, Carter worked on The Oprah Winfrey Show, starting as an associate producer and becoming senior producer of the show.

The View 
From 2015 to 2020, Carter served as the executive producer on The View television talk show. Carter was nominated for Daytime Emmy Awards for her role as the executive producer on The View in 2016, 2017, 2018, and 2019. In 2020, the show won the Emmy Award for "Outstanding Informative Talk Show". It was inducted into the NAB Broadcasting Hall of Fame that same year. According to Essence magazine, Carter was the first black woman to executive produce the show.

Tamron Hall talk show 
In 2020, Carter became the executive producer on the Tamron Hall talk show, which she left in the fall of 2021.

Knocking 
In 2022, Carter joined Knocking.com, an e-commerce production company, as its chief content officer.

Awards and nominations 
 1994: Daytime Emmy Awards “Outstanding Children’s Programming Special” for WISN-TV
 2020: Daytime Emmy Awards “Best Informative Talk Show” winner for The View (talk show)

Personal life
Carter lives in Montclair, New Jersey with her husband and two children.

References

External links
 

Living people
Morrissey College of Arts & Sciences alumni
African-American television producers
American women television journalists
African-American women journalists
21st-century American women
1969 births